Qeshlaq (also Romanized as Qeshlāq; also known as Qeshlāg and Qīshlāq) is a village in Mansur-e Aqai Rural District, Shahu District, Ravansar County, Kermanshah Province, Iran. At the 2006 census, its population was 1,164, in 279 families.

References 

Populated places in Ravansar County